Jairaj may refer to:

 Paidi Jairaj, Indian film actor, director and producer
 Jairaj Phatak, 25th municipal commissioner of the Brihanmumbai Municipal Corporation (BMC), India

See also
Jairajpur, a village in Azamgarh District, Uttar Pradesh, India